Jeong Yeong-wung (born June 19, 1979) is an EBS voice actor.

Role 
 Kotencotenco - Great Demon King
 Death Note - Prisoner, Mafia, Teacher
 Inspector Gadget (1983 TV series) - Dr. Claw, MAD Agent, Grappler, Spuds Marlone
 Inspector Gadget (2015 TV series) - Dr. Claw
 Gantz - Yoshioka
 Engine Sentai Go-onger - Engine Banki, Rairaiken, Engine Dai-Shogun, Teacher
 Robot Power
 Digimon Data Squad - Sarbleomon, Ikkakumon
 Fairy Tail - Wally Buchanan
 The Amazing Adrenalini Brothers
 Transformers: Prime - Bulkhead, Vehicons, Insection
 Garfield's Fun Fest - Eli, Junior Bear
 Doraemon: Nobita's New Great Adventure into the Underworld - The Seven Magic Users - Great Demon King
 Kimba the White Lion (2009 movie) - Goda, Skunk, Animals, People
 One Piece - Edward Weevil
 Mobile Suit Gundam AGE - Stoller Guavaran
 Case Closed - Gin, Saeki (Animax), Hitoshi Komatsu (Tooniverse)
 Star Wars Rebels - Garazeb Orrelios
 Nana - Okazaki, Yamagishi
 The Kindaichi Case Files - Mikoto Wajima, Shimon Madarame
 GR: Giant Robo - Katsumi Arashi
 Eyeshield 21
 Zatch Bell - Gangster, Rembrant
 Regal Academy - Campus Dragon, Beast Coach
 Hunter × Hunter OVA - Series 3: G.I. Final - True Bisuke
 Robocar Poli - Max, Spooky
 Bunnicula - Harold
 Noonbory and the Super Seven - Rosygury, Coldygury
 Hoodwinked 2: Hood vs. Evil - Giant
 Wander Over Yonder - Giant Worm
 Black Jack 21 - Dr. Cuma
 Open Season 2 - Ian, Rufus, Reilly
 Super Wings - Paul
 Mini Force
 Mini Force: New Heroes Rise
 Mini Force X - Dancho
 Chuggington - Harrison, M'tambo
 Power Battle Watchcar - Maru, Mac
 Power Battle Watchcar: The Counterattack of Watch Mask - Maru, Mac
 Tom and Jerry Tales - King, Butch
 The Secret of the Sword - Cringer, Battlecat
 Deko Boko Friends - Big Oggo
 Naughty Nuts - Krust
 Tayo the Little Bus - Big, Sky
 Mune: Guardian of the Moon - Leeyoon, Krrrack
 Olobob Top - Narrator
 The Mr. Men Show - Mr. Strong, Mr. Scatterbrain, Mr. Nosy
 Cocomong - Potato-pow
 Trollhunters - AAARRRGGHH!!!
 The Angry Birds Movie - Bomb
 Uchu Sentai Kyuranger - Champ/Oushi Black

Games 
 StarCraft: Remastered - Cerebrate
 StarCraft II: Wings of Liberty - Marauder, Gabriel Tosh
 Cyphers - Leyton
 Dota 2 - Tidehunter
 Blade & Soul
 Elsword - Shadow Master, Avalanche, Joaquin, Ifritan, Ska, Meson
 Dungeon Fighter Online - Don Enzo Sipo
 World of Warcraft
 Hearthstone
 Karma Returns
 Kurtzpel

References

External links 
Jeong Yeong Wung information in EBS 

1979 births
Living people
South Korean male voice actors
21st-century South Korean male actors
Place of birth missing (living people)